WHDH-TV, VHF analog channel 5, was a television station licensed to Boston, Massachusetts, United States. The station ceased operations on March 18, 1972, following the revocation of the station's license. The channel 5 allocation in the market was taken over by WCVB-TV the following morning, March 19, 1972. WCVB operates using a separate license from WHDH-TV; conversely, the original WHDH-TV is also of no relation to the current WHDH (channel 7), which is a news-intensive independent; it served as the Boston market's NBC affiliate from January 2, 1995, through December 31, 2016.

History
The station first signed on the air on November 26, 1957. It was owned by the Boston Herald Traveler Corporation, along with WHDH radio (850 AM, now WEEI; and 94.5 FM, now WJMN). Before the Herald-Traveler signed the station on, the DuMont Television Network applied for the channel 5 construction permit to replace WDTV (now KDKA-TV) in Pittsburgh among its owned-and-operated station group, but DuMont shut down its network before being able to acquire the permit. WHDH-TV was originally an ABC affiliate, but switched to CBS on January 1, 1961. The move was initiated by CBS after its existing Boston station, WNAC-TV (channel 7) was agreed to be sold by RKO General to NBC in a deal which ultimately never materialized.

Initially, WHDH-TV shared studio facilities with WHDH radio located at 6 St. James Avenue in Boston's Back Bay; but this facility was far from ideal for television and in early 1960, the station moved into a newly built studio center at 50 Morrisey Boulevard in the Dorchester section of Boston. Channel 5 was the first television station in New England to originate live (and later taped) local programming in color. In 1959, WHDH-TV debuted a local version of Bozo the Clown with Frank Avruch as Bozo; in 1966, 130 episodes taped by WHDH-TV that year would go into national syndication for television stations that did not want to produce a local Bozo show.

Almost as soon as it signed on, the Federal Communications Commission (FCC) began investigating allegations of impropriety in the granting of the television license. This touched off a struggle that lasted 15 years. As a result, WHDH-TV never had a license longer than six months at a time (television station licenses at the time lasted for three years). In 1969, a local group, Boston Broadcasters Incorporated (BBI), was granted a construction permit for a new station on channel 5 under the call letters WCVB-TV after promising to air more local programming than any other station in America at the time (even though WHDH often broadcast more local programming, in terms of hours per week, than any other commercial television station in the market). The challenger was also critical of the combination of the Herald-Traveler newspaper and WHDH-AM-FM-TV. Herald-Traveler Corporation fought the decision in court, but lost its battle in 1972; and Boston Broadcasters was awarded a full license.

In the months after the Herald-Traveler lost then channel 5 license, it was under court order to sign off daily at 1:00 a.m. so that WCVB-TV could test its equipment. WHDH-TV declined to sell its studios, transmitter and tower to the new WCVB-TV, which subsequently leased space on the tower belonging to WBZ-TV (channel 4) and remodeled a former International Harvester truck dealership in Needham to serve as its studios and offices. All of WHDH-TV's talent, however, transferred to WCVB.

Fixed Bayonets! (1951), a late movie, wound up serving as the last telecast from the original Channel 5; the telecast began at 11:30 p.m. on March 18, 1972, and ended at 1:00 a.m. on March 19, 1972. CBS balked at the prospect of massive pre-emptions in Boston and moved its affiliation to WNAC-TV, leaving the new WCVB-TV to take on the ABC affiliation, which it retains to this day. 

The WHDH-TV call letters were subsequently reassigned to channel 7 almost 18 years to the day of their last use, on March 12, 1990, where they remain to this day.

News operation
WHDH's newscasts were known as WHDH-TV News, a title that was used until March 18, 1972, when the station signed off for the last time and was replaced by WCVB.

Among the anchors who worked there were John Day, Jack Hynes, John Henning, Chet Curtis, and in the final months before WHDH was forced off the air, a young reporter/anchor named Natalie Jacobson. The lead sports anchor beginning in 1962 was Don Gillis (prior to that, sports scores were read by the news anchor) while weather reports were done first by Fred B. Cole, then Ray Miller, and finally Bob Copeland.

The station won several awards for news coverage, including multiple honors as "National News Film Station of the Year" from the National Press Photographers Association. When WCVB launched, nearly all of the former WHDH news staffers were hired by that station.

Sports coverage
WHDH was television home of the Boston Red Sox baseball franchise from 1958 to 1971; with Curt Gowdy, Ned Martin, and later, Ken Coleman doing play-by-play, with analysis during the 1960s provided by former star Red Sox pitcher Mel Parnell, and starting in 1969, by former Sox star Johnny Pesky. Although these announcers worked on both television and radio, the games were simulcast only through 1960; after that, the announcers would go back-and-forth between radio and television broadcasts. For televised games beginning in 1961, the analyst would perform color commentary for the entire game with Gowdy (through 1965) or Coleman (1966–71) doing the play-by-play of innings 1-3 and 7-9 on television (and innings 4-6 on radio); while Martin called innings 1-3 and 7-9 on radio along with the middle innings on television. An average of 56 regular-season games were televised each year, equally split between home and away matches, with all but a handful being on weekends. The games were also fed to other television stations (mainly CBS affiliates) across the New England region.

During the 1964–65 and 1965–66 seasons, WHDH also televised a few Boston Bruins hockey games. These games were broadcast on Sundays, usually pre-recorded on tape, with either Saturday night games shown on Sunday afternoons, or Sunday night games shown on tape delay after that evening's 11 p.m. newscast. One game, on February 12, 1966, a Saturday matinee from the old Madison Square Garden in New York City against the New York Rangers was carried live and in color back to Boston, using a color mobile unit owned by New York-based independent station WOR-TV (at that time co-owned with Boston station WNAC-TV; now known as Secaucus, New Jersey-licensed WWOR-TV and owned by Fox Television Stations)—which produced a videotaped broadcast of the game to air in that market that evening.

The station also broadcast a handful of Boston Celtics basketball games during the early-to-mid 1960s. These were usually weekend afternoon games that were not televised nationally. WHDH broadcast Celtics playoff away games from 1962 to 1966, although WHDH did televise live coverage of the seventh and final game of the 1962 NBA Finals between the Celtics and the Los Angeles Lakers from the old Boston Garden—a game that was not nationally televised. Only WHDH and KTLA Los Angeles carried it, with Don Gillis doing the game for WHDH and Chick Hearn doing the KTLA broadcast.

In 1965, Celtics' playoff away games were also shown on the newly launched WIHS-TV (channel 38, now WSBK-TV). WIHS carried some regular-season Celtics' road games during the 1964–65 season, but team officials, worried about the low penetration of UHF receivers in the Boston area, arranged for WHDH to simulcast 1965 playoff games in order to reach a wider audience. WHDH alone was the television home of the Celtics in the 1965–66 season, with coverage concentrated on away games during the playoffs. Fred Cusick did the Bruins' games; Don Gillis called the Celtics' games.

In October 1958, WHDH launched a weekly candlepin bowling show that aired at noon on Saturdays. Initially co-hosted by Jim Britt and Don Gillis, Gillis eventually became the solo host. The show was extremely successful and remained on channel 5 (with Gillis still as host) until February 1996, long after WHDH had given way to WCVB.

In 1968, with the Harvard University football team about to host arch-rival Yale University in a showdown of unbeaten teams for the Ivy League football championship, WHDH made plans to cover the game. Due to ABC Sports' deal with the National Collegiate Athletic Association (NCAA) that precluded live telecasts of games not part of the ABC/NCAA package, WHDH broadcast the game on tape the next day, with Gillis doing play-by-play.

Notable former on-air staff
 Frank Avruch – booth announcer; also played Bozo the Clown (1959-1970)(deceased)
 Jim Britt – sportscaster (deceased)
 Ken Coleman – sportscaster and play-by-play of Boston Red Sox games (1966–1971) (deceased)
 Bill Crowley – sportscaster; analyst on Boston Bruins games (1964–1966)
 Chet Curtis – news anchor/reporter (deceased)
 Fred Cusick – sportscaster; play-by-play commentator of Boston Bruins games (1964–1966) (deceased)
 Leo Egan – news/sports anchor (Deceased)
 Don Gillis – sportscaster and longtime host of a weekly bowling show; also play-by-play of Boston Celtics games (1962–1964 and 1966) (deceased)
 Art Gleeson – analyst on Boston Red Sox games (1958–1961) (deceased)
 Curt Gowdy – sportscaster and play-by-play of Boston Red Sox games (1958–1965) (deceased)
 Bill Harrington – news reporter
 John Henning – news anchor/reporter (deceased)
 Peter Hyams – news anchor (now movie director/screenwriter)
 Natalie Jacobson - reporter and final trainee
 Roy Leonard – personality (deceased)
 Ned Martin – sportscaster and play-by-play of Boston Red Sox games (1961–1971) (deceased)
 Johnny Most – sportscaster (deceased)
 Mel Parnell – analyst on Boston Red Sox games (1962–1968) (deceased)
 Johnny Pesky – analyst on Boston Red Sox games (1969–1971) (deceased)
 Caroll Spinney – actor; played various characters on Bozo the Clown; later became the longtime performer of Big Bird and Oscar the Grouch on Sesame Street (deceased)
 Lesley Stahl – reporter (now at CBS News)
 Bob Wilson – announcer/news reporter/sportscaster (deceased)

Notes

References
 bostonradio.org's WEEI (AM) history including a section on WHDH-TV
 Channel 5 history on WCVB-TV's website which erroneously claims "the station" went on in 1957.  WCVB-TV didn't go on air until 1972, which is covered on-site. - dead link

External links
Streaming archival footage

Defunct television stations in the United States
Television channels and stations established in 1957
Television channels and stations disestablished in 1972
Defunct companies based in Massachusetts
Boston Herald
National Hockey League over-the-air television broadcasters
HDH-TV (1957-1972)
HDH-TV
1957 establishments in Massachusetts
1972 disestablishments in Massachusetts